Shōzō Okada (岡田周造, Okada Shozo, November 1886 – May 31, 1983) was a Japanese politician. He was born in Tochigi Prefecture. He was a graduate of the University of Tokyo. He was a governor of Chiba Prefecture (1931), Yamaguchi Prefecture (1931-1933), Nagano Prefecture (1933-1935), Hyōgo Prefecture (1936-1938) and Tokyo (1938-1941).

1886 births
1983 deaths
Governors of Tokyo
Governors of Hyōgo Prefecture
Governors of Nagano
Governors of Yamaguchi Prefecture
Governors of Chiba Prefecture
Politicians from Tochigi Prefecture
University of Tokyo alumni